Matthieu de Castro Malo, C.O. or Matheus de Castro Mahalo (1604–1677) was a Roman Catholic prelate who served as Titular Bishop of Chrysopolis in Arabia (1637–1677) and Vicar Apostolic of Idalcan (1637–1669).

Biography
Matthieu de Castro Malo was born in 1604 and ordained a priest in the Oratory of Saint Philip Neri.
On 14 November 1637, he was appointed during the papacy of Pope Urban VIII as Vicar Apostolic of Idalcan and Titular Bishop of Chrysopolis in Arabia.
On 30 November 1637, he was consecrated bishop by Andrea Soffiani, Bishop of Santorini, with Domenico Marengo, Bishop of Syros e Milos, and Giacomo Della Rocca, Bishop of Termia, serving as co-consecrators. 
He served as Vicar Apostolic of Idalca until his resignation in 1669. 
He died on 20 July 1677.

References

External links and additional sources
 (for Chronology of Bishops) 
 (for Chronology of Bishops)  

17th-century Roman Catholic titular bishops
Bishops appointed by Pope Clement VIII
1604 births
1677 deaths
Oratorian bishops